Artocarpus mariannensis (Chamorro: dugdug), also known as the Marianas breadfruit or the seeded breadfruit, is a species of plant in the mulberry / fig family, Moraceae.  It is endemic to the Mariana Islands and Guam. It has been utilised extensively by the Micronesian people, being one of the staple food crops that was introduced to other islands in Micronesia.

See also
 Domesticated plants and animals of Austronesia

References 

mariannensis
Micronesian cuisine
Flora of the Mariana Islands